Lamido Grand Mosque is a mosque in Ngaoundéré, Cameroon.

See also
 Islam in Cameroon

Mosques in Cameroon
Adamawa Region